Alex Kahsay is an Eritrean singer. He has released two solo albums, Abaditey and Ziyaday, in the Tigrinya language.

He was a member of Adulis Band with Kahsay Berhe and others. They were best known for singing Tigrinya, Amharic, and English.

Discography
Albums
 Abaditey
Embaba Ayney
Emuna
Lowo-nkulu
Kale aydelin
Qsenely
Seb
Tuemyu dehay
Ziyaday
Aminey
Kinaday Kinblo
Hadech
Tsinat Gebri
Tewerisu
N'Beyney
Mistir
Alku Bel

References

Year of birth missing (living people)
21st-century Eritrean male singers
Living people